PK-35 Vantaa (previously Pallokerho-35 or PK-35) was a Finnish men's football team, based in Vantaa. It last played in the Veikkausliiga, the top-tier men's football league in Finland. The team was based at the Myyrmäen jalkapallostadion in the Myyrmäki district of Vantaa at the time of its dissolution, after the 2016 season.

History
PK-35 was founded in Vyborg in 1935. After the Finnish Winter War and Second World War, PK-35 was refounded in Helsinki in 1948. When PK-35 was coached by Pasi Rautiainen in the mid-1990s they were promoted to Finland's top division, the Veikkausliiga. After some economic troubles, the club's top representative team was acquired by Hjallis Harkimo and renamed FC Jokerit. The PK-35 club, however, continued with the other teams in lower divisions using its original name. PK-35 was promoted to Kakkonen in 2001 and to Ykkönen in 2005.

Move to Vantaa 
After the 2008 season Pallokerho-35 decided to move its men's and women's first teams to the commuter town of Vantaa, where they played at ISS Stadion in Myyrmäki. The teams were run by a newly created association and competed with the name PK-35 Vantaa. Pallokerho-35 and its other teams (juniors) stayed in Helsinki under the association PK-35 ry (main club).

Bankruptcy 

The club suffered serious financial problems in its final years. Sitting bottom of the 2016 Veikkausliiga, the club were docked 6 points and manager Shefki Kuqi left to join Inter Turku.

The club was relegated at the end of the season but did not apply for a licence to play in the 2017 Ykkönen and ceased operations. The club's name continues however as the club which split from the PK-35 organisation when it was renamed FC Jokerit still play in the Helsinki area Kolmonen division (4th tier).

Season to season

Management
As of 2 August 2016.

See also
FC Jokerit

References

External links

PK-35 Vantaa official website 

Football clubs in Finland
1935 establishments in Finland
Association football clubs disestablished in 2016
Sport in Vantaa